Khosrow Shakibai (March 27, 1944 – July 18, 2008) was an Iranian actor. He has received various accolades, including three Crystal Simorgh, a Hafez Award, two Iran Cinema Celebration Awards and an Iran's Film Critics and Writers Association Award.

Career 

He ranks amongst the most accomplished actors of his generation. Khosrow Shakibai was born to Colonel Ahmad Shakibāi and Ms Farideh Khātami. His father, who was an army Colonel, died from cancer when Khosrow (called Mahmoud by family and close friends) was only fourteen. Khosrow studied acting at Faculty of Fine Arts of University of Tehran. He began his stage career in 1963 and branched out his activities into film dubbing in 1968. Shakibā'í initiated his film acting in 1982 with Khatt-e Ghermez (The Red Line), directed by Masoud Kimiai. He had played in seven feature films when the film director Dariush Mehrjui offered him the title role of Hamoun, a film that over time has achieved a cult status.

Shakibai's performance in Hamoun marked a turning point in his career. He received a Crystal Simorgh at Fajr International Film Festival for his portrayal of Hamoun, a literary intellectual who gradually loses his touch with reality and becomes entrapped into an obsessive and destructive conflict with his estranged wife whom he deeply loves. Shakibai played also in some major television series. He won a Crystal Phoenix for Kimiā (The Philosopher's Stone) (1994) directed by Ahmad Reza Darvish.

Shakibai found also a considerable following for his voice, brought about through publication of the recordings of his readings of poems by contributors to modern Persian poetry including Forough Farrokhzad and Sohrab Sepehri.
Shakibai is credited for helping to raise the stature of performing arts in Iran by the end of the 1980s, when the authorities in charge tended to neglect this area of cultural activities.
He married twice. From his first marriage with the actress Tānyā Joharí he has one daughter named Poupak, and from his second marriage with Parvin Koush'yār one son named Pouria.

Death 
Khosrow Shakibai died at 6 am on July 18, 2008, of liver cancer in Pārsiān Hospital in Tehran. Earlier it had been reported that Shakibai's death had been a consequence of his heart failure.  It has further been reported that on October 5, 2007, Khosrow Shakibai had been admitted to a hospital for suffering from diabetes, however on his explicit request the press had withheld this information from public.
On Sunday, July 20, 2008, the body of Khosrow Shakibai was laid to rest in The Artists Section of Behesht-e Zahra Cemetery in Tehran. His funeral procession began at 9 am from Vahdat Hall (Tālār-e Vahdat), Hafez Street, in Tehran and Shahab Moradi was the speaker of his memorial ceremony.

Filmography

Film

Television
 Roozi Roozegari (Once Upon A Time), directed by Amrollah Ahmadjoo, 1989 (1368 AH)
 Modarres (The Teacher), ???, ???
 Khaneh-ye Sabz (The Green House), directed by Bijan Birang and Masoud Resām, 1996 (1375 AH)
 Kaktus (Cactus), directed by Mohammd-Reza Honarmand, 1998 (1377 AH)
 Tofange Sar-por (The Gun Loaded), directed by Amrollah Ahmadjoo, 2002/2003 (1381/1382 AH)
 Dar Kenar-e Ham (Being Together), directed by Fat'h-Ali Oveisi, 2002 (1381 AH)
 Sarzamin-e Sabz (The Green Country), directed by Bijan Birang and Masoud Resām, 1997 (1376 AH)
 Miras (Inheritance), directed by Mohammad-Hossein Zeyn'ali, 2007 (1386 AH)
 Sheikh Bahai (see Sheykh Bahaee, aka Baha' al-Din al-'Amili), directed by Shahrām Asadi, 2008 (1387 AH)

Discography

Spoken word albums
 Nāmeh-hā (The Letters), poems by Sayyed-Ali Sālehi
 Sedaye paye ab  ( The sound of the water's foodsteps ), poems by  Sohrab Sepehri
 Neshāni-hā (The Addresses), poems by Sayyed-Ali Sālehi
 Mehrabāni (Kindness), poems by Mohammad Reza Abdolmalekian
 Hajm-e Sabz (The Green Volume), poems by Sohrab Sepehri
 Pari Khāni (Reading the Angels), poems by Forough Farrokhzad
 Albom-e Sohrāb (Shohrab's Album), poems by Sohrab Sepehri

Awards and nominations

Awards
 Crystal Simorgh at the 8th Fajr International Film Festival, 1989 (1368 AH), for his main role in Hamoun
 Crystal Simorgh at the 13th Fajr International Film Festival, 1993 (1373 AH), for his main role in Kimiā (The Philosopher's Stone)
 Golden Tablet by the Iran Actor Site, 2003 (1382 AH), the 3rd Series, for Kāghaz-e bi Khatt (Unruled Paper)
 Crystal Simorgh at the 23rd Fajr International Film Festival, 2004 (1383 AH), for his supporting role in Sālād-e Fasl (The Garden Salad)
 Certificate of Honour at the 25th Fajr International Film Festival, 2006 (1385 AH), for his main role in Otobus-e Shab (The Night Bus)
 Second best Actor in the category of men, for Kāghaz-e bi Khatt (Unruled Paper), during the 17th sequence, 2002 (1381 AH), by Writers and Critics

Nominations
 Crystal Simorgh at the 11th Fajr International Film Festival, 1992 (1371 AH), for his main role in Yek'bār Barāy-e Hamisheh (Once and for Ever)
 Crystal Simorgh at the 15th Fajr International Film Festival, 1996 (1375 AH), for his main role in Sāyeh be Sāyeh (In Close Pursuit)
 Crystal Simorgh at the 20th Fajr International Film Festival, 2001 (1380 AH), for his main role in Kāghaz-e bi Khatt (Unruled Paper)
 Golden Tablet by the Iran Actor Site, 2005 (1384 AH), the 6th Series, for Sālād-e Fasl (The Garden Salad)
 Golden Tablet by the Iran Actor Site, 2005 (1384 AH), the 6th Series, for Hokm (The Verdict)
 Golden Image (Tandis-e Zarrin), 2006 (1385 AH), for the best main role in the category of men in the feature film Che Kasi Amir rā Kosht? (Who Killed Amir?)

References
 Kosrow Shakibā'i, in Persian, a concise artistic biography of Kosrow Shakibā'i, IranAct.
 Parviz Jāhed, Bāzi tamām shodeh ast (The Play is Over), in Persian, Radio Zamāneh, July 19, 2008. .
 The body of Kosrow Shakibā'i is laid to rest (Paykar-e Kosrow Shakibā'i Tash'ee Shod), in Persian, Jām-e Jam, July 20, 2008, .
 Kosrow Shakibā'i from Vahdat Hall to the Eternal House (Kosrow Shakibā'i az Tālār-e Vahdat tā Khāneh-ye Abadi), in Persian, Jām-e Jam, July 20, 2008, .
Specific

External links

 
 Kosrow Shakibā'i Died, in Persian, Āftāb, July 18, 2008, .
 Kosrow Shakibā'i Died, in Persian, Radio Zamaneh, July 18, 2008, .
 Kosrow Shakibā'i Died, in Persian, BBC Persian, July 18, 2008, .
 Reminiscences of some prominent film directors of artists, in Persian, ISNA, July 18, 2008, .
 A gallery of twenty-two photographs of Kosrow Shakibā'i:  Fars News Agency.
 Two short excerpts, consisting of monologues of Kosrow Shakibā'i, of the motion picture Who Killed Amir? (Che Kasi Amir rā Kosht?) (2006) directed by Mehdi Karampour, YouTube:  (2 min 46 sec),  (6 min 22 sec).
 Kosrow Shakibā'i reads Forough Farrokhzad's Negāh Kon (Look On!), YouTube:  (the initial 3 min 40 sec).
 Shahāb Mirzāi, Hamid Hamoun Has Died, in Persian, Jadid Online, 2008, .Akbar talking in Who Killed Amir?, Jadid Online, 2008:  (1 min 58 sec).

1944 births
2008 deaths
Iranian male actors
Iranian screenwriters
Iranian male film actors
Deaths from liver cancer
Iranian male stage actors
Iranian male voice actors
Deaths from cancer in Iran
University of Tehran alumni
Iranian male television actors
Crystal Simorgh for Best Actor winners
Burials at artist's block of Behesht-e Zahra
Crystal Simorgh for Best Supporting Actor winners